Xylopia aromatica is a species of plant in the Annonaceae family and the accepted name of Xylopia xylopioides.

It is a tree native to Cerrado grassland vegetation, particularly in the states of Goiás and Minas Gerais, in eastern Brazil.

References

External links

aromatica
Endemic flora of Brazil
Flora of the Cerrado
Flora of Goiás
Flora of Minas Gerais